Datadog is an observability service for cloud-scale applications, providing monitoring of servers, databases, tools, and services, through a SaaS-based data analytics platform.

History 
Datadog was founded in 2010 by Olivier Pomel and Alexis Lê-Quôc, who met while working at Wireless Generation. After Wireless Generation was acquired by NewsCorp, the two set out to create a product that could reduce the friction they experienced between developer and systems administration teams, who were often working at cross-purposes.

They built Datadog to be a cloud infrastructure monitoring service, with a dashboard, alerting, and visualizations of metrics. As cloud adoption increased, Datadog grew rapidly and expanded its product offering to cover service providers including Amazon Web Services (AWS), Microsoft Azure, Google Cloud Platform, Red Hat OpenShift, VMware, and OpenStack.

In 2015, Datadog announced the acquisition of Mortar Data, bringing on its team and adding its data and analytics capabilities to Datadog's platform. That year, Datadog also opened a research and development office in Paris.

In 2016, Datadog moved its New York City headquarters to a full floor of the New York Times Building to support its growing team, which doubled over the course of the year. Datadog announced the beta-release of Application Performance Monitoring in 2016, offering for the first time a full-stack monitoring solution. As of 2017, the company has close to 300 employees, the vast majority of which are located in the US (with offices in Manhattan, Boston, and Baltimore) and a new R&D facility in Paris.

In 2017, Datadog acquired the Paris-based Logmatic.io, a platform-agnostic service for querying and visualizing logs to monitor and troubleshoot online services. In 2019, Madumbo, an AI-based application testing platform, joined Datadog.

In 2019, Datadog established a Japanese subsidiary in Tokyo with enterprise technology veteran, Akiyoshi Kunimoto, as Country Manager for Japan.

The mascot is a dog named Bits. In August 2022, Datadog acquired Seekret, an API observability company.

In November 2022, it was announced Datadog had acquired the New York-based visualisation service for cloud and system architects, Cloudcraft, for an undisclosed sum.

Technology 
Datadog uses a Go based agent, rewritten from scratch since its major version 6.0.0 released on February 28, 2018. It was formerly Python based, forked from the original created in 2009 by David Mytton for Server Density (previously called Boxed Ice). Its backend is built using a number of open and closed source technologies including D3, Apache Cassandra, Kafka, PostgreSQL, etc.

In 2014, Datadog support was broadened to multiple cloud service providers including Amazon Web Services (AWS), Microsoft Azure, Google Cloud Platform and Red Hat OpenShift. Today, the company supports over 450 integrations.

Funding 
In 2010, Datadog launched with a seed round, with participation by NYC Seed, Contour Venture Partners, IA Ventures, Jerry Neumann and Alex Payne, among others. In 2012, it raised a $6.2 million Series A round co-led by Index Ventures and RTP Ventures. In 2014, Datadog raised a $15 million Series B round led by OpenView Venture Partners, followed by a $31 million Series C round led by Index Ventures in 2015. Datadog opened 2016 with a $94.5 million Series D round led by ICONIQ Capital, one of the largest funding rounds for a New York City company during that year.

Datadog went public on the Nasdaq exchange on September 19, 2019, selling 24 million shares and raising $648 million.

Reception 
Datadog was listed in Forbes' Cloud 100 and was ranked in the top ten fastest growing companies in North America in Deloitte's 2016 Fast 500 List. In both 2015 and 2016, Crain's named Datadog to its list of the 100 Best Places to Work in New York City. Datadog was also listed on Wealth front's 2017 Career-Launching Companies List and Business Insider's 51 enterprise startups to bet your career on in 2017. BuiltIn named it Boston's 5th top company to work for in 2019.

References

External links 

 

2010 establishments in New York City
2019 initial public offerings
American companies established in 2010
Companies listed on the Nasdaq
Internet properties established in 2010
Software performance management
Website monitoring software
Publicly traded companies based in New York City
Software companies based in New York City
Software companies established in 2010
Software companies of the United States
System monitors
Systems management